Miguel Couto was a Brazilian educationist, politician and a member of the Brazilian Academy of Letters. He was born Miguel de Oliveira Couto in the city of Rio de Janeiro, on May 1, 1864. He was the son of Francisco de Oliveira Couto and Maria Rosa do Espírito Santo. He was trained in medicine, and went on to teach the subject, gaining a reputation as one of the most noted clinicians in contemporary Brazil.

Couto was multilingual and profoundly knowledgeable in the Portuguese language. For many years, he was a vocal opponent of Japanese immigration to Brazil. He was a loud proponent of national education. Even before the October 1930 Revolution, he had given a speech at the Brazilian Education Association on July 2, 1927, in which he presented a project on education, which was widely distributed in all normal schools and professional institutes of the then Federal Capital. He recommended the creation of a Ministry of Education in this document, with "two departments: that of education and that of hygiene". Subsequently, in November 1930, a decree by the Head of the Provisional Government of the Republic created a Ministry of Education and Public Health.

He was elected federal deputy in the Constituent Assembly that would draft the Constitution of July 16, 1933. He chaired the National Academy of Medicine for 21 consecutive years. He was the third occupant of Chair 40 of the Brazilian Academy, to which he was elected on December 9, 1916. He succeeded Afonso Arinos in this chair and received into the Academy by Mário de Alencar on June 2, 1919.

He died in Rio on June 6, 1934.

References

Brazilian politicians